The 2009–10 PBA season was the 35th season of the Philippine Basketball Association (PBA). The season formally opened on October 11, 2009, and ended on August 18, 2010. The league started the season with the Philippine Cup, or the traditional All-Filipino Conference, while finishing the season with the import-laiden Fiesta Conference.

The 2009 PBA Draft was held on August 2, 2009, at the Market! Market!, and Japeth Aguilar was selected first overall by the Air21 Express. The Puerto Princesa City Government hosted the 2010 PBA All-Star Weekend at the Puerto Princesa Coliseum in Palawan on April 25, 2010.

Pre-season events

Player movement

Key transactions:
Trades:
Burger King traded Arwind Santos to San Miguel for Marc Pingris and Ken Bono. Both players were later traded to Purefoods in exchange for the team's 2010 1st and 2nd round picks.
Barangay Ginebra traded Paul Artadi, Rafi Reavis, and the rights to 2009 draftee Chris Timberlake for Enrico Villanueva, Rich Alvarez, Celino Cruz, and Paolo Bugia of Purefoods.
Burger King traded Pocholo Villanueva to Ginebra for rights to rookie Orlando Daroya and future picks.
Sta. Lucia traded Dennis Miranda to San Miguel for future draft picks.
Sta. Lucia traded Dennis Espino to Coca-Cola for two future draft picks and Jason Misolas.

Signing:
Rain or Shine signed Mike Hrabak.
Coca-Cola signed Norman Gonzales.

Resigning:
Barangay Ginebra re-signed center Eric Menk.

Rule changes
The PBA board approved the rule changes for implementation starting in the pre-season games:

Notable occurrences
The third set of inductees for the PBA Hall of Fame were awarded on October 9 at the Shangri-la Hotel in Makati.
The pre-season was started on September 25 but was cut short due to the onslaught of Typhoon Ondoy in Metro Manila.

Opening ceremonies
The season began on October 11 with the Purefoods Tender Juicy Giants defeating the Burger King Whoppers, 90-83.

The muses for the participating teams are as follows:

2009–10 Philippine Cup

Notable events
After playing with just one game with the Burger King Whoppers, top rookie pick Japeth Aguilar was traded to Talk 'N Text after a three-way trade involving Barako Bull. Burger Kings was able to get Barako Bull's 2010 (previously acquired by Talk ‘N Text) and 2012 first-round picks and will also take Talk ‘N Text’s 2013 and 2014 first-round picks. Barako Bull will now have the rights on Orlando Daroya while Talk ‘N Text will get Aguilar, who will be loaned to Smart Gilas.
Wynne Arboleda of the Burger King Whoppers was suspended without pay for the rest of the season plus one game after a violent altercation with a fan during their game against Smart Gilas last October 16. He also drew a PhP20,000 fine. While serving his suspension, Arboleda cannot be present at the playing venues during Burger King’s games.
On October 29, 2009. The PBA commissioner Sonny Barrios announced that the games played by the Smart Gilas National Team will have no effects on the standings of the other teams of the PBA. This decision was made by the commissioner because of the intensity of the games played against Smart Gilas that resulted in the suspension of and the possibility of criminal charges against Wynne Arboleda as a result of him attacking a fan at courtside in Araneta Coliseum when the Burger King Whoppers played the Smart Gilas National Team.
Talk 'N Text walked out of the playing court during their quarterfinal game with Barangay Ginebra leading 27–20 with a minute left in the first quarter after Ranidel de Ocampo was called for a flagrant foul against Ronald Tubid. Besides forfeiting Game 4 to their opponent, Commissioner Sonny Barrios penalized the telecommunication franchise of fines ranging over P1 million. The P500,000 for the forfeiture (the said amount going to Barangay Ginebra as indicated to the league's by-laws), an additional P500,000 fine, which will go directly to the league's Players’ Educational Trust Fund, and the team's share in the gate receipts and TV revenues for that particular game, which ranges anywhere between P200,000 to P250,000.

Elimination round

Playoffs

Wildcard phase

1st round

2nd round

Quarterfinals 

|}

Semifinals 

|}

Third place playoff

Finals 

|}
Finals MVP: James Yap (Purefoods)
Best Player of the Conference: James Yap (Purefoods)

Mid-season break events

Player movement

Key transactions:
Trades:
Air21 traded JR Quiñahan, Mark Yee and Aaron Aban to Talk 'N Text for Yancy de Ocampo and Renren Ritualo.
Air21 traded Yancy de Ocampo and their second round pick for the 2010 PBA Draft to Barangay Ginebra for Rich Alvarez and Doug Kramer.
Air21 traded Alex Cabagnot to San Miguel for Mike Cortez.
Sta. Lucia Realtors traded Joseph Yeo to San Miguel for Bonbon Custodio.

Team re-brandings
The Burger King Whoppers returned to their previous identity as the Air21 Express.
San Miguel Corporation changed the name of the Purefoods Tender Juicy Giants to the Derby Ace Llamados.
The Barako Bull Energy Boosters changed their moniker to the Barako Energy Coffee Masters.

Notable occurrences
The board of governors approved stiffer penalties for teams that would walk out of a game and rookie draftees who would turn their back on the league.

2010 Fiesta Conference

Notable events
Wynne Arboleda returned as an active player of the Air21 Express after he was reinstated by the Office of the Commissioner after serving eight months of suspension.

Elimination round

Playoffs

Wildcard phase

1st round

2nd round

Quarterfinals 

|}

Semifinals 

|}

Third place playoff

Finals 

|}
Finals MVP: Cyrus Baguio and LA Tenorio (Alaska)
Best Player of the Conference: Jay Washington (San Miguel)
Best Import of the Conference: Gabe Freeman (San Miguel)

2010 PBA All-Star Weekend

The 2010 PBA All-Star Weekend was held from April 22 to 25 at the Puerto Princesa Coliseum, Puerto Princesa, Palawan. The winners were:

Obstacle Challenge: Jonas Villanueva (San Miguel Beermen)
Three-point Shootout: Mark Macapagal (Coca-Cola Tigers)
Slam Dunk Competition: Niño Canaleta (Derby Ace Llamados)

Rookie-Sophomore Blitz Game

 Blitz Game MVP: Jared Dillinger (Sophomores)

All-Star Game

 All-Star Game MVP: Gabe Norwood (North All-Stars)

Awards

PBA Annual Awards 
Most Valuable Player: James Yap (Derby Ace)
Rookie of the Year: Rico Maierhofer (Derby Ace)
First Mythical Team:
LA Tenorio (Alaska)
James Yap (Derby Ace)
Jay Washington (San Miguel)
Arwind Santos (San Miguel)
Sonny Thoss (Alaska)
Second Mythical Team:
Roger Yap (Derby Ace)
Mark Cardona (Talk 'N Text)
Joe Devance (Alaska)
Kelly Williams (Talk 'N Text)
Asi Taulava (Coca-Cola)
All-Defensive Team:
Arwind Santos (San Miguel)
Marc Pingris (Derby Ace)
Gabe Norwood (Rain or Shine)
Roger Yap (Derby Ace)
Ryan Reyes (Talk 'N Text)
Most Improved Player: LA Tenorio (Alaska)
Sportsmanship Award: Cyrus Baguio (Alaska)

Awards given by the PBA Press Corps
 Coach of the Year: Ryan Gregorio (B-Meg Derby Ace)
 Mr. Quality Minutes: KG Canaleta (B-Meg Derby Ace)
 Comeback Player of the Year: Kelly Williams (Talk 'N Text)
 Executive of the Year: Wilfred Uytengsu (Alaska)
 Referee of the Year: Manolito Quilingen
All-Rookie Team
Rico Maierhofer (B-Meg Derby Ace)
Josh Urbiztondo (Sta. Lucia)
Ronnie Matias (Air21)
Ogie Menor (Barako Bull)
Jervy Cruz (Rain or Shine)

Cumulative standings

Elimination/classification rounds

Playoffs

References

External links
PBA.ph

 
PBA